Union City Transit is a public transit service in Union City, California, in the San Francisco Bay Area.   , Union City Transit operates 5 bus lines that connect riders to local destinations, such as schools, shopping centers, and the Union City BART station. All routes operate 7 days a week.

Union City Transit serves Union City and along Whipple Rd in southern Hayward.  

AC Transit, Dumbarton Express, Stanford Marguerite Shuttle also provide service to and from Union City.

History 
Union City Transit began operations in 1974 with the opening of the Union City BART station as "the Flea."

On 12 October 2013, the transit agency expanded its service significantly by providing:
 New routes on top of its existing services (removing the A and B suffixes from Route 1)
 More hours on its most popular services
 Saturday service on seven routes (Routes 1, 2, 3, 4, 5, 7 and 8)
 Sunday service on six routes (Routes 1, 2, 3, 4, 5 and 8)
 A more frequent service along Alvarado-Niles Road, one of the city's main arterial roads (Routes 1, 3, 5, 8, and 9)
 A new express service (Route 9) that operates peak periods between BART and residential neighborhoods on the western part of the city
Due to the COVID-19 pandemic, Union City transit changed to a 5 route service starting 22 March 2021, down from the previous 8 routes, with routes 7, 8, and 9 being eliminated. Saturday and Sunday schedules were consolidated into a single weekend schedule, and vehicle frequencies on 3 of the most used routes were increased (Routes 1, 2 and 5).

Fares 
Union City Transit accepts cash and the Clipper card.
Fares are effective 1 January 2020 

† Children under the age of 5 may ride free, but must be accompanied by an adult.
‡ Appropriate identification must be presented to obtain the discounted Senior/Disabled fare.
§ Only available on the Clipper card.

₮ Union City Transit paper transfers are issued only at time a cash fare is paid. Paper transfers are not needed when using Clipper. Union City Transit transfers are valid for one transfer within 90 minutes of issue. Electronic BART-to-Bus transfers are loaded onto a Clipper Card upon exiting the BART station via the fare gates.  Transfers and passes must be valid.

Routes
The main transfer points for Union City Transit are located at Union City BART and the Union Landing Transit Center.

Former/ Suspended Routes

Gallery

References

External links
Union City Transit official website
Union City Transit info at transit.511.org

Bus transportation in California
Public transportation in Alameda County, California
Union City, California
Government agencies established in 1974
1974 establishments in California